Sea Typhoon may refer to:

 A typhoon that occurs in the sea
 A carrier variant of the Hawker Typhoon
 A carrier variant of the Eurofighter Typhoon